Ahmed Samir Mohamed (born 25 August 1994) is an Egyptian footballer who plays for Tala'ea El Gaish.

Club career

Dakhleya
Samir played for El Dakhleya in the Egyptian Premier League and made his debut in 2011 versus Al-Mokawloon Al-Arab.

Zamalek
Samir signed for Zamalek in 2014 summer transfers. He won the Premier league.

International career
He won the African Youth Championship with Egypt in March 2013, scoring in the final's penalty shoot-out.
.

Honours

Club
Zamalek SC
Egyptian Premier League (1): 2014–15

Tala'ea El Gaish
Egyptian Super Cup (1): 2020–21

International
Egypt U-20
African Youth Championship (1): 2013

References

External links
 Ahmed Samir on kingfut.com (player profile)
 Ahmed Samir at Footballdatabase

1994 births
Living people
Egyptian footballers
Zamalek SC players
Association football midfielders
2013 African U-20 Championship players
Egypt youth international footballers
Egyptian Premier League players